W. E. B. Du Bois Memorial Centre for Pan-African Culture is a memorial place, a research facility and tourist attraction in the Cantonments area of Accra, Ghana, that was opened to the public in 1985. It is named in dedication to W. E. B. Du Bois, an African-American historian and pan-Africanist who became a citizen of Ghana in the early 1960s. He lived there in his last few years at the invitation of President Kwame Nkrumah, while compiling the Encyclopedia Africana.

History
The Du Bois Centre is located at No. 22 First Circular Road, in Cantonments, Accra, Ghana, the former residence of W. E. B. Du Bois. He died there on 27 August 1963. It was opened to the public on 22 June 1985 and was named a national memorial in November that year.

The Centre houses a small museum with part of Du Bois's personal library and a collection of his works, which are made available to researchers. An adjacent shrine shelters his grave and the ashes of his second wife, Shirley Graham Du Bois.

References

External links
 (archived 7 July 2019)
W. E. B. Du Bois Centre in Accra, Ghana Tourism
W E B Du Bois Memorial Centre, Time Out

Pan-Africanist organizations in Africa
Pan-Africanism in Ghana
Monuments and memorials in Ghana
W. E. B. Du Bois